Ondrej is a Slovak male given name, equivalent to Andrew. Notable people with the name include:

 Ondrej Duda, Slovak football player
 Ondrej Otčenáš (1987), Slovak ice hockey player
 Ondrej Nepela, Slovak figure skater
 Ondrej Nepela Arena
 Ondrej Janík, Slovak ice hockey player
 Ondrej Zošiak (1990), Slovak ice hockey defenceman

See also
Ondřej, the Czech version of the same name, but is pronounced with a soft "ř"

Slovak masculine given names